
Year 706 (DCCVI) was a common year starting on Friday (link will display the full calendar) of the Julian calendar. The denomination 706 for this year has been used since the early medieval period, when the Anno Domini calendar era became the prevalent method in Europe for naming years.

Events 
 By place 

 Byzantine Empire 
 February 15 – Emperor Justinian II presides over the public humiliation of his predecessors, Leontios and Tiberios III, and their chief associates in the Hippodrome of Constantinople, after which they are executed. Patriarch Kallinikos I is also deposed, blinded and exiled to Rome, and succeeded by Kyros.

 Europe 
 Duke Corvulus of Friuli is arrested by King Aripert II of the Lombards, and has his eyes gouged out. He is replaced by Pemmo, who begins a war against the Slavs of Carinthia (modern Austria).

 China 
 July 2 – Emperor Zhong Zong has the remains of his mother and recently deceased ruling empress Wu Zetian, her son Li Xian, her grandson Li Chongrun, and granddaughter Li Xianhui, all interred in the same tomb complex as his father and Wu Zetian's husband Gao Zong, outside Chang'an, known as the Qianling Mausoleum, located on Mount Liang, which will then remain unopened until 1960.

 By topic 

 Religion 
 Berhtwald, archbishop of Canterbury, is obliged by the pope's insistence to call the Synod of Nidd (Northumbria). 
 Caliph Al-Walid I commissions the construction of the Great Mosque of Damascus (Syria).

Births 
 Al-Walid II, Muslim caliph (d. 744)
 Eoppa, king of Wessex (d. 781)
 Fujiwara no Nakamaro, Japanese statesman (d. 764)
 Han Gan, Chinese painter (d. 783)
 Theudoald, nephew of the Frankish ruler Charles Martel (d. 741)

Deaths 
 February 15 – Leontios, Byzantine emperor
 February 15 – Tiberios III, Byzantine emperor
 Gisulf I, duke of Benevento 
 Kallinikos I, patriarch of Constantinople (or 705)
 Shenxiu, Chinese Zen Buddhist patriarch
 Zhang Jianzhi, official of the Tang Dynasty (b. 625)

References